Frederick William Francis (22 December 1917 – 17 March 2007) was an English cinematographer and film director. 

Francis started his cinematography career with British films such as Jack Cardiff's Sons and Lovers (1960), Jack Clayton's drama Room at the Top (1959) and psychological horror film The Innocents (1961). He became known for his collaborations with David Lynch with The Elephant Man (1980), Dune (1984), and The Straight Story (1999). He also earned acclaim for his work on The French Lieutenant's Woman (1981) starring Meryl Streep, and Martin Scorsese's Cape Fear (1991). As a director, he was associated with the British production companies Amicus and Hammer in the 1960s and 1970s.

Francis earned many accolades, including two Academy Awards for Sons and Lovers (1960) and Glory (1989). He also earned five British Academy Film Award nominations, as well as an international achievement award from the American Society of Cinematographers in 1997 and BAFTA's special achievement award in 2004.

Early life
Born in Islington in London, England, Francis originally planned to become an engineer. At school, a piece he wrote about films of the future won him a scholarship to the North West London Polytechnic in Kentish Town. He left school at age 16, becoming an apprentice to photographer Louis Prothero. Francis stayed with Prothero for six months. In this time they photographed stills for a Stanley Lupino picture made at Associated Talking Pictures (later Ealing Studios). This led to his successively becoming a clapper boy, camera loader and focus puller. He began his career in films at British International Pictures, then moved to British and Dominions. His first film as a clapper boy was The Prisoner of Corbal (1936).

War service 
In 1939, Francis joined the Army, where he would spend the next seven years. Eventually, he was assigned as cameraman and director to the Army Kinematograph Service at Wembley Studios, where he worked on many training films. About this, Francis said, "Most of the time I was with various film units within the service, so I got quite a bit of experience in all sorts of jobs, including being a cameraman and editing and generally being a jack of all trades."

Career

1950–56: Early work 
Following his return to civilian life, Francis spent the next 10 years working as a camera operator. Films he worked on during this period include The Elusive Pimpernel (1950), The Tales of Hoffmann (1951), Beat the Devil (1953), and Moby Dick (1956); he was a frequent collaborator with cinematographers Christopher Challis (nine films) and Oswald Morris (five films). His first feature with Morris was Golden Salamander (1950). Francis was on the second unit of Moby Dick. He became a main unit director of photography on A Hill in Korea (1956), which was shot in Portugal.

1959–68 : British films 
He subsequently worked on such prestige British dramas such as Room at the Top (1959), Saturday Night and Sunday Morning (1960), Sons and Lovers (1960), and The Innocents (1961), which he regarded as one of the best films he shot.

For his work on Jack Cardiff's Sons and Lovers he received his first Academy Award for Best Cinematography. The film depicts societal repression in a small coal-mining town during the early 1900s. In the 1961 article of American Cinematographer, the magazine praised his work by stating that the film has "unusual visual beauty and is marked by photographic ingenuity throughout that easily makes it one of the finest monochrome photographic achievements to come along in some time." Cinematographer John Bailey also praised his work saying, "Then I saw Sons and Lovers, and I was knocked out by the poetry and visual beauty of the film. The camerawork was unlike anything I had seen before in an English-language movie."

He next collaborated with director Jack Clayton for the psychological drama film The Innocents starring Deborah Kerr. Francis worked with the CinemaScope aspect ratio. He used colour filters and used the lighting rig to create darkness consuming everything at the edge of the frame. Francis used deep focus and narrowly aimed the lighting towards the centre of the screen. Francis and Clayton framed the film in an unusually bold style, with characters prominent at the edge of the frame and their faces at the centre in profile in some sequences, which, again, created both a sense of intimacy and unease, based on the lack of balance in the image. For many of the interior night scenes, Francis painted the sides of the lenses with black paint to allow for a more intense, "elegiac" focus, and used candles custom-made with four to five wicks twined together to produce more light.

Influential The New Yorker film critic Pauline Kael praised Francis for his work writing, "I don’t know where this cinematographer Freddie Francis sprang from. You may recall that in the last year just about every time a British movie is something to look at, it turns out to be his".

1963–70: Work as a director 
Following his Academy Award win for Sons and Lovers, Francis began his career as director of feature films. His first feature as director was Two and Two Make Six (1962). For the next 20-plus years, Francis worked continuously as a director of low-budget films, most of them in the genres of horror or psycho-thriller. Beginning with Paranoiac (1963), Francis made numerous films for Hammer throughout the 1960s and 1970s. These films included thrillers like Nightmare (1964) and Hysteria (1965), as well as monster films such as The Evil of Frankenstein (1964) and Dracula Has Risen from the Grave (1968). On his apparent typecasting as a director of these types of film, Francis said "Horror films have liked me more than I have liked horror films".

Also in the mid-1960s, Francis began an association with Amicus Productions, another studio like Hammer which specialised in horror pictures. Most of the films Francis made for Amicus were anthologies such as Dr. Terror's House of Horrors (1965), Torture Garden (1968) and Tales from the Crypt (1972). He also did two films for the short-lived company Tyburn films. These were The Ghoul (1975) and Legend of the Werewolf (1975). As a director, Francis was more than competent, and his horror films possessed an undeniable visual flair. He regretted that he was seldom able to move beyond genre material as a director. Francis directed the little-seen Son of Dracula (1974), starring Harry Nilsson in the title role and Ringo Starr as Merlin the Magician. Of the films Francis directed, one of his favorites was Mumsy, Nanny, Sonny, and Girly (1970). Mumsy... was a black comedy about an isolated, upper-class family whose relationships and behaviors came equipped with deadly consequences. The film was not very well received by mainstream critics but has gone on to become a minor cult favorite among fans. In 1985, Francis directed The Doctor and the Devils, based on the crimes of Burke and Hare.

1980–91: Return to cinematography 
In 1980 he returned to work as a director of photography this time for David Lynch in the British drama The Elephant Man (1980). The Elephant Man was principally shot at Wembley Studios in Panavision, utilizing Kodak's Plus X stock — the only monochrome emulsion that met Francis’ standards and was available in sufficient quantities. He earned great acclaim for his gorgeous black-and-white cinematography earning a British Academy Film Award nomination. Ben Kenigsberg of The New York Times dissected Francis' work on the film writing, "Francis takes advantage of opportunities for high contrast, but note how more subtle elements of Francis’s shading affect the storytelling. Lynch defers a full look at the deformed title character, John Merrick (John Hurt), to milk it for maximum impact. So Francis shows Merrick in varying degrees of shadow for the first half-hour — until a nurse stumbles upon him, at last fully illuminated by a skylight, and screams."

Francis gained a new-found industry and critical respect as a cinematographer. During the 1980s, collaborated with Lynch two more times with the science fiction film Dune (1984) and the drama The Straight Story (1999), which was shot on location in Iowa in 23 days. One of his favorite camera operators was Gordon Hayman.

He worked on films such as The Executioner's Song (1982), Clara's Heart (1988). Francis's last film as director was 1987's Dark Tower (no relation to the 2004 book of the same name by Stephen King). Francis thought it was a bad picture owing to poor special effects and had his name taken off it. His name was substituted with the name Ken Barnett.

With his work on the Civil War drama Glory (1989) directed by Edward Zwick he earned his second Academy Award. David E. Williams of American Cinematographer wrote, "Francis and director Zwick studied period stills by famed photographer Matthew Brady and others. The stark black-and-white images suggested a realistic approach devoid of filtration or sepia tones, relying instead on the credibility of the locations and production design to simulate the era. Photographically, Francis rendered Glory simply and honestly, with much of the intimate drama revealed in the light and shadow playing upon soldiers’ faces". Francis said of the experience "I’m a great believer in the futility of war and I believe we captured that idea quite well in several parts of Glory. That was always in the back of my mind."

Francis provided the cinematography for the critical favorite The Man in the Moon as well as Martin Scorsese's remake of Cape Fear (both 1991). Francis' suggested that he earned the job working with Scorsese was a recommendation that came from director Michael Powell. Francis again sought to utilize deep focus in order to keep the audience anxiously searching the frame for the psychopathic Max Cady played by Robert De Niro. Francis spoke fondly of his working relationship with Scorsese saying,

Francis' final feature film as a director of photography was a reunion with David Lynch the small intimate drama The Straight Story (1999).

2004–12: Recognition and final years 
Francis received many industry awards, including, in 1997, an international achievement award from the American Society of Cinematographers, and in 2004, BAFTA's special achievement award. Francis is featured in the book Conversations with Cinematographers (2012) by David A Ellis and published by American publisher Scarecrow Press.

Personal life
Francis married Gladys Dorrell in 1940, with whom he had a son; in 1963 he married Pamela Mann-Francis, with whom he had a daughter and a second son.

Francis died at age 89 as the result of the lingering effects of a stroke.

Filmography

As cinematographer
Film

Television

As director
 Two and Two Make Six (1962)
 Paranoiac (1963)
 The Evil of Frankenstein (1964)
 Traitor's Gate (1964)
 Nightmare (1964)
 Dr. Terror's House of Horrors (1965)
 The Skull (1965)
 Hysteria (1965)
 The Psychopath (1966)
 The Deadly Bees (1967)
 They Came from Beyond Space (1967)
 Torture Garden (1967)
 Dracula Has Risen from the Grave (1968)
 Trog (1970)
 Mumsy, Nanny, Sonny and Girly (1970)
 The Vampire Happening (1971)
 Tales from the Crypt (1972)
 The Creeping Flesh (1973)
 Tales That Witness Madness (1973)
 Son of Dracula (1974)
 The Ghoul (1975)
 Legend of the Werewolf (1975)
 The Doctor and the Devils (1985)
 Dark Tower (1989)

Awards and nominations

References

Sources
 Freddie Francis: The Straight Story from Moby Dick to Glory, a Memoir - Freddie Francis (with Tony Dalton), Scarecrow Press, 2013.
 The Films of Freddie Francis – Wheeler Winston Dixon, Scarecrow Press, 1991.  (hardcover)
 The Men Who Made The Monsters – Paul M. Jensen, published 1996 –  (paperback)

External links

Freddie Francis The British Entertainment History Project
 
 Freddie Francis biography on (re)Search my Trash

1917 births
2007 deaths
British Army personnel
Military personnel from Middlesex
Best Cinematographer Academy Award winners
British Army personnel of World War II
English cinematographers
German-language film directors
Horror film directors
People from Islington (district)
Film directors from London